Cassavetes is a Greek surname. Notable people with the surname include:

John Cassavetes (1929-1989), Greek-American independent film director
Katherine Cassavetes (1906-1983), his mother, an actress
Nick Cassavetes (born 1959), his son, an actor and director
Alexandra Cassavetes (born 1965), his daughter, an actress and director
Zoe Cassavetes (born 1970), his daughter, a director

Greek-language surnames
Surnames